Ibn Yamin (also spelled Ibn-i Yamin; ; 1286/87–1368) was a Persian poet who served under the Ilkhanate, Sarbadars, and Kartids.

Biography 
Ibn Yamin was born in 1286/87 in the town of Faryumad in western Khorasan. He belonged to a family of local landowners, a status they had seemingly held since ancient times. His father was the mustawfi (director of finance) of the governor of Khorasan, Khwaja Ala al-Din Muhammad. Ibn Yamin was educated in his hometown, which was then a center of culture. He had a typical education, being primarily related to medicine and literature. At a young age, Ibn Yamin became interested in poetry due to his father also being a poet. Following his father's death in 1323/24, Ibn Yamin was appointed court poet, financial official, and later mustawfi of Khwaja Ala al-Din Muhammad. He also eventually received the title of amir. Ibn Yamin disliked the court life, and fell into a conflict with his Khwaja Ala al-Din Muhammad, who was replaced by Tari Tagha'i between 1327–1329. The new governor was a tyrant who initially confiscated most of Ibn Yamin's property, and then later took the rest. In 1337, Ibn Yamin went to the city of Gurgan, where he served as the court poet of Togha Temür (died 1353), a claimant to the Ilkhanate throne. In 1341, Ibn Yamin entered into the service of the Sarbadars.

Ibn Yamin died at Faryumad in 1368.

A Shia Muslim, Ibn Yamin was one of the first poets to write about the Twelve Imams and the Battle of Karbala.

References

Sources

Further reading 
 
 

14th-century Iranian people
1280s births
1368 deaths
Ilkhanate-period poets